Al-Wathiqu Billah Sultan Mizan Zainal Abidin ibni Almarhum Sultan Mahmud Al-Muktafi Billah Shah (born 22 January 1962) is the 18th and current Sultan of Terengganu. He served as the 13th Yang di-Pertuan Agong, the constitutional monarch of Malaysia, from 2006 to 2011. He is Malay by ethnicity and an adherent of Sunni Islam.

Early life and education
Mizan Zainal Abidin was born at Istana Maziah in Kuala Terengganu, the eldest son of Sultan Mahmud Al-Muktafi Billah Shah by his second wife, Sharifa Nong Fatima Alsaggof. Sharifa's family is of Arab descent, from Sayidd Omar Aljunied (her maternal great-grandfather), one of the modern pioneers of Singapore.

Mizan Zainal Abidin studied at Sekolah Kebangsaan Sultan Sulaiman and Sekolah Menengah Sultan Sulaiman, Kuala Terengganu.  He went overseas to study at the Geelong Grammar School in Geelong, Australia.  In 1988, he completed his undergraduate studies at US International University-Europe (now called Alliant International University) in London, earning a B.A. in International Relations.

Mizan Zainal Abidin participated in the military course PRE SMC (E) 33 at the Army School of Languages from 1982 to 1983.  He then studied the military course SMC 33 at Royal Military Academy Sandhurst in England, successfully completing the course as Cadet Officer on 9 December 1983.

Career before becoming Sultan
On 15 September 1981, Tuanku Mizan was appointed as Assistant Land Levy Collector, working for a period of about a year at the District Land Office in Kuala Terengganu, prior to his departure overseas to attend the military course in England.  Tuanku Mizan's next appointment in 1988 was as State Administrative Officer at the State Economic Planning Unit (UPEN) in Wisma Darul Iman, Kuala Terengganu.  Besides working for UPEN, Tuanku Mizan was also Assistant District Land Officer at the Kuala Terengganu District Land Office.

Sultan
Mizan was appointed the Yang di-Pertuan Muda of the State of Terengganu on 6 November 1979.  On 20 October 1990, he was appointed the Regent of Terengganu to 8 November 1990.

From 1991 to 1995, Mizan was President of the Council for Islam and Malay Culture of Terengganu.

Mizan became the youngest ruler of a Malaysian federal state when he was appointed as the Sultan of Terengganu on 15 May 1998 following the death of his father, Sultan Mahmud. Mizan was crowned as the 17th Sultan of Terengganu on 4 March 1999.

2008 Menteri Besar Appointment Crisis
The state of Terengganu, where Barisan Nasional won two-thirds of the seats in the state parliament, was the last to appoint a Menteri Besar (Chief Minister) after the 2008 general elections. In the formation of the new Terengganu state government, the federal government under Prime Minister Abdullah Ahmad Badawi recommended Idris Jusoh as Menteri Besar, who received full support of 23 of the 24 Barisan Nasional state assemblymen elected. However, on 22 March, the office of the Sultan of Terengganu announced the appointment of Kijal assemblyman Ahmad Said instead of Idris Jusoh, as was the Sultan's constitutional right.

The Prime Minister claimed that the appointment of Ahmad Said was unconstitutional as it went against the wishes of the assemblymen and the Prime Minister's office, all of whom had supported Idris Jusoh's candidacy for Menteri Besar.

On 26 March, Prime Minister Abdullah Ahmad Badawi and Sultan Mizan Zainal Abidin met at Istana Negara to resolve the impasse. The Prime Minister accepted the King's appointment of Ahmad Said as Menteri Besar of Terengganu. He also apologised to the King for the public spat over the appointment of the Menteri Besar, explaining that there was no intention to disparage or humiliate the royal household. This apparent climbdown was due to the possibility that the royal household would be prepared to dissolve the state assembly if there had been a motion of no-confidence against Ahmad Said by the 23 UMNO state assemblymen.

Deputy Yang di-Pertuan Agong
Mizan was appointed Deputy Yang di-Pertuan Agong on 26 April 1999 after Sultan Salahuddin Abdul Aziz Shah, the Sultan of Selangor was elected the 11th Yang di-Pertuan Agong by the Conference of Rulers. Following the illness and subsequently death of Salahuddin, Mizan served as Acting YDPA from 8 October to 12 December 2001.

Mizan was re-appointed Deputy Yang di-Pertuan Agong on 13 December 2001 after the Conference of Rulers elected Tuanku Syed Sirajuddin as the 12th YDPA.

Mizan served as the first Chancellor of Universiti Malaysia Terengganu (UMT) from 2001 to 2006.

Yang di-Pertuan Agong
On 3 November 2006, Mizan was elected by the Conference of Rulers to become the 13th YDPA, with his five-year term starting 13 December 2006.  The Conference of Rulers appointed Sultan Abdul Halim of Kedah as the Deputy YDPA.  Mizan's appointment was the fourth following a second rotation system amongst the nine Malay Rulers.  This five-year rotational constitutional monarchy is unique to Malaysia.

On 26 April 2007, Mizan was formally installed as Yang di-Pertuan Agong.

Mizan, 44, is the third youngest YDPA after Tuanku Syed Putra of Perlis and Tuanku Abdul Halim of Kedah who were elected at age 40 and 43 respectively. He is also the first Yang di-Pertuan Agong born after Hari Merdeka (Malaysian Independence Day), which fell on 31 August 1957.

Marriage and family

Mizan married Sultanah Nur Zahirah on 28 March 1996 in Kuala Terengganu. She is the second Raja Permaisuri Agong (Queen of Malaysia) to habitually wear the hijab (ritual Islamic headscarf for women), and the third to have been born a commoner.

The royal couple has two sons and two daughters: 
Her Highness Tengku Nadhirah Zaharah, the Tengku Puteri Utama Raja (b. 18 December 1996) 
His Royal Highness Tengku Muhammad Ismail, the Crown Prince (b. 1 March 1998)
His Highness Tengku Muhammad Mua′az, the Tengku Sri Setia Mahkota Raja (b. 22 December 2000)
Her Highness Tengku Fatimatuz Zahra, the Tengku Puteri Daulath Raja (b. 19 April 2002)

After Sultan Mizan was elected as Yang di-Pertuan Agong, he appointed Tengku Muhammad Ismail, then aged eight, as Regent on 12 November 2006. Because of Tengku Muhammad Ismail's young age, a three-member Regency Advisory Council was established to discharge his duties for him. The council's members were Tengku Baderulzaman, Sultan Mizan's younger brother, Tengku Sulaiman Ismail, Sultan Mizan's uncle, and former Federal Court judge Dato' Abdul Kadir Sulaiman. He was proclaimed as regent during a ceremony on 12 December.

Upon reaching Mukallaf (13 years of age), the Islamic age of responsibility, and according to Shariah law and the constitution of Terengganu, Tengku Muhammad Ismail became able to discharge his duties himself.  However, the Sultan formed another council, Majlis Perwakilan Pemangku Raja, to perform the Regent’s duty while he was away from Terengganu pursuing his studies.  This second and current council is headed by Tengku Mustafa Kamel, another of Sultan Mizan’s younger brothers, together with former Regency Advisory Council members Tengku Sri Laksamana Raja Tengku Sulaiman Ismail and Dato' Haji Abdul Kadir Sulaiman.

During his younger days, Sultan Mizan was a keen footballer. He is currently active in golf, endurance riding and scuba diving. In addition, the Global Taekwondo Federation (GTF) awarded Mizan an Honorary 7th Degree Black Belt in recognition of his active participation in the sport.

Honours
See also : List of honours of the Terengganu Royal Family by countryHe has been awarded the following honours:

Honours of Terengganu
  Supreme Royal Family Order of Terengganu Grand Master and recipient (DKT, since 15 May 1998)
  Royal Family Order of Terengganu : Founding Grand Master and recipient (DKR, 6 July 2000)
  Family Order of Terengganu : First Class (DK I, 9 March 1981) and Grand Master (since 15 May 1998)
 Order of Sultan Mizan Zainal Abidin of Terengganu :
  Founding Grand Master and Knight Grand Companion (SSMZ, 6 July 2001)
  Founding Supreme class (SUMZ, 26 May 2005)
  Order of Sultan Mahmud I of Terengganu : Member Grand Companion (SSMT, 12 February 1989) and Grand Master (since 15 May 1998)
  Order of the Crown of Terengganu : Knight Grand Commander (SPMT, 6 March 1982) and Grand Master (since 15 May 1998)

Honours of Malaysia
  (as Yang di-Pertuan Agong from 13 December 2006 until 12 December 2011) :
  Order of the Royal House of Malaysia (DKM) : Grand Master (2006-2011) and Recipient (5 April 2007)
  Order of the Crown of the Realm : Recipient (DMN, 27 February 1999) and Grand Master (2006-2011)
  Order of the Defender of the Realm : Grand Commander (SMN, 27 February 1999) and Grand Master (2006-2011)
  Order of Loyalty to the Crown of Malaysia : Grand Master (2006-2011)
  Order of Merit of Malaysia : Grand Master (2006-2011)
  Order for Important Services (Malaysia) : Grand Master (2006-2011)
  Order of the Royal Household : Grand Master (2006-2011)
  :
  First Class of the Royal Family Order of Johor (DK)
  Knight Grand Commander of the Order of the Crown of Johor (SPMJ, 8 April 1986)
  Sultan Ibrahim Coronation Medal (23 March 2015)
  :
  Member of the Royal Family Order of Kedah (DK, 21 January 2002)
  :
  Recipient of the Royal Family Order or Star of Yunus (DK, 30 March 2002)
  :
  Member of the Royal Family Order of Negeri Sembilan (DKNS, 19 July 2001)
  :
  Recipient of the Royal Family Order of Perak (DK)
  :
  Recipient of the Perlis Family Order of the Gallant Prince Syed Putra Jamalullail (DK, 28 May 1998)
  :
  First Class of the Royal Family Order of Selangor (DK, 10 April 2003)

Foreign Honours
  : Recipient of the Royal Family Order of the Crown of Brunei (DKMB) (9 March 1999)
  : Grand Cross with Collar of the Order of the Merit of Chile
  : Commander of the National Order of the Legion of Honour
  : First class (or Adipurna) of the Star of the Republic of Indonesia (17 October 2011)
  : Grand Cordon of the Order of Independence of Qatar (13 December 2010)
  : Knight of the Order of Rajamitrabhorn (9 March 2009)

Legacy
Several projects and institutions were named after the Sultan, including:

Educational institutions

Institut Pendidikan Guru, Kampus Sultan Mizan in Besut
Politeknik Sultan Mizan Zainal Abidin in Dungun
SMK Tengku Mizan Zainal Abidin in Kuala Terengganu

Buildings, Bridges and Roads

Tuanku Mizan Zainal Abidin Mosque (known as Iron Mosque) in Putrajaya
Sultan Mizan Zainal Abidin Stadium in Kuala Terengganu
Tengku Mizan Zainal Abidin Mosque in Kerteh
Hospital Angkatan Tentera Tuanku Mizan Zainal Abidin in Wangsa Maju, Kuala Lumpur (Main Military Hospital)
Jalan Tengku Mizan on Federal Route 65 in Kuala Terengganu

Others

Yayasan DiRaja Sultan Mizan (YDSM) or Sultan Mizan Royal Foundation

Ancestry

References

 Sultan Mizan moved to tears at ceremony, The Star,  13 December 2006.
 Sultan Mizan the second youngest to become King, The Star,  14 December 2006.
 Majestic welcome for Terengganu royals, The Star'',  14 December 2006.

|-

|-

Monarchs of Malaysia
Mizan Zainal Abidin
1962 births
Living people
Malaysian people of Thai descent
Malaysian people of Arab descent
Marshals of the Royal Malaysian Air Force
Mizan Zainal Abidin
Malaysian Muslims
Malaysian people of Malay descent
Mizan Zainal Abidin
People educated at Geelong Grammar School
Graduates of the Royal Military Academy Sandhurst
United States International University alumni

Mizan Zainal Abidin
Mizan Zainal Abidin
Mizan Zainal Abidin
Mizan Zainal Abidin

Recipients of the Darjah Kerabat Diraja Malaysia
First Classes of Royal Family Order of Selangor
First Classes of the Royal Family Order of Johor
Knights Grand Commander of the Order of the Crown of Johor
Members of the Royal Family Order of Kedah

Commandeurs of the Légion d'honneur
20th-century Malaysian politicians
21st-century Malaysian politicians
Southeast Asian Games gold medalists for Malaysia
Southeast Asian Games medalists in equestrian
Competitors at the 2017 Southeast Asian Games
Recipients of the Order of the Crown of the Realm
Recipients of the Order of Merit of Malaysia